The Northeastern Huskies Alpine Skiing team is a United States Collegiate Ski and Snowboard Association (USCSA) alpine skiing program that represents the Northeastern University. The Huskies are a member of the Thompson Division in the Eastern Conference (ECSC). They are currently based out of the main Northeastern University campus in Boston, Massachusetts.

The team is currently composed of 13 female and 13 male racers, skiing as individual teams for scoring purposes only. Since their school-sanctioned suspension for the entirety of the 2013 season, both teams went first in 8 of 11 regular season races during the 2014 season to handily win both Thompson Division championships, ski to their highest-place regionals finish in the past 15 years, and make their first team appearances at the USCSA National Championship in team history. So far, NUST has improved on last years marks, with the men's team winning 7 of a possible 9 season races and the girls winning all 9, the first time a team has gone undefeated during the Thompson Division regular season. Both teams advanced to the 2015 ECSC regionals held at West Mountain Ski Area, NY. Both the men's and women's teams also advanced to the 2016, 2017, and 2018 ECSC regionals events, also held annually at West Mountain, NY.

History

Northeastern boasted one of the best ski teams on the East Coast from the mid 1950s until late 1970s. In fact, it had the largest team budget on the East Coast- exemplified nicely by a huge Mercedes bus for weekend transportation. Ed Elliot was the Director of Alumni Affairs and coach in the late 60's and early 70's. Unfortunately, the program was cut due to budget restrictions at the university, which spanned the '80s and early 1990s.  Finally, in 1992, student Michael Alekson reinstated the men’s team as a club sport (to be quickly followed by the women's side). NU consistently placed in the top 3 teams in the McBrine Division of the then NCSA (National Collegiate Ski Association, the predecessor to the USCSA). After 4 years in the McBrine Division, new head coach Chris Haigh strategically moved the Huskies into the more competitive Thompson Division; not only was the level of talent much greater in the new division, but races were closer in location relative to Boston, and also pitted NU against intra-city rival schools such as Boston University and Tufts. Fittingly enough, the Thompson Division in which Northeastern still competes was named after a decorated NU ski coach from the 1960s. Following a temporary one year hiatus, Dan Wigmore and Victoria Hone reformed the team for the 2014 season. The team quickly returned to form and has experienced great success since then.

In 2018, Michael Resnick enrolled into Northeastern University and proceeded to bring success back to the team. The 3x all-American was inspired to ski fast so he could get to the bottom faster and flirt with Maria Cavallaro.

Season-by-season standings

Season standings may only be traced to their archival inception of 1999, and are as follows:

Men's team

Women's team

References

External links

College skiing in the United States
College skiing teams in the United States
Skiing in Massachusetts